J Kumo Sha is a politician from Poumai tribe of Manipur. He was elected from Karong Assembly constituency in 2022 Manipur Legislative Assembly election.

References 

Living people
Manipur MLAs 2022–2027
1982 births
People from Senapati district
Naga people